Joseph Thomas Pannunzio (born July 4, 1959) is an American football coach for the Philadelphia Eagles. He is a former player and executive. He served as head football coach at Murray State University (MSU) from 2000 to 2005, compiling an overall record of 30–37. Pannunzio was the director of football operations at the University of Alabama from 2011 to 2014. He was the special teams/tight ends coach in 2017, and running backs coach in 2018 for the University of Alabama. He is currently the director of team development for the Philadelphia Eagles of the National Football League (NFL).

Coaching career

Murray State
In November 2002, Murray State won a share of the Ohio Valley Conference championship with a 37–35 win over an Eastern Illinois squad led by future NFL quarterback Tony Romo. Kicker Shane Andrus made the 52-yard game-winning field goal as time expired. The Racers finished the season 7–4 and 5–1 in conference, and MSU received the OVC's automatic bid to the Division I-AA playoffs. In the first round of the NCAA Division I playoffs, the Racers faced off against the arch rival Western Kentucky on the road in Bowling Green, Kentucky. The Hilltoppers won the rivalry game 59–20 and went on to win the Division I-AA national championship.

On April 29, 2005, Pannunzio was placed on paid administrative leave following the arrest of a Murray State football player and a former player on drug trafficking and weapons charges. Ron Lane, a junior running back, and Terrence Biggers, a former wide receiver, were charged with trafficking in a controlled substance within 1,000 yards of a school and possession of drug paraphernalia. Following the incident, athletic director Allen Ward stated, "charges of this severity and magnitude demand stepped-up review of our football program." Ron Lane was removed from the team and both students were banned from campus.

Murray State finished the 2005 season with a winless conference record of 0–7 and an overall record of 2–9. In November 2005, Pannunzio was notified that his contract would not be renewed. According to an interview several years later with former Murray State president F. King Alexander, Alexander explained Pannunzio's departure by stating, "I fired our football coach, Joe Pannunzio, because of numerous incidents that occurred in our program under him that were quite bad." Murray State's overall record under Pannunzio was 30–37 (.448), which left him as one of five Racer football coaches with overall losing records.

Head coaching record

References

External links
 Philadelphia Eagles profile

1959 births
Living people
American football quarterbacks
Alabama Crimson Tide football coaches
Auburn Tigers football coaches
Colorado Mesa Mavericks football coaches
CSU Pueblo ThunderWolves football players
CSU Pueblo ThunderWolves football coaches
Kansas State Wildcats football coaches
Miami Hurricanes football coaches
Minnesota Golden Gophers football coaches
Murray State Racers football coaches
Ole Miss Rebels football coaches
People from Pueblo, Colorado
Philadelphia Eagles coaches
Philadelphia Eagles executives
TCU Horned Frogs football coaches